Streptomyces coelescens is a bacterium species from the genus of Streptomyces. Streptomyces coelescens produces glycoglycerolipids.

See also 
 List of Streptomyces species

References

Further reading

External links
Type strain of Streptomyces coelescens at BacDive -  the Bacterial Diversity Metadatabase

coelescens
Bacteria described in 1970